Ladislav Jiránek-Strana (26 February 1883 – 10 February 1952) was a Czech sprinter. He competed in the men's 100 metres at the 1912 Summer Olympics representing Bohemia.

References

1883 births
1952 deaths
Athletes (track and field) at the 1912 Summer Olympics
Czech male sprinters
Olympic athletes of Bohemia
Place of birth missing